Horatio's Drive: America's First Road Trip is a 2003 documentary film directed by Ken Burns and written by Dayton Duncan. Its subject is the first cross-country automobile journey in the United States, which occurred during the summer of 1903. The documentary focuses primarily on Horatio Nelson Jackson and his Winton car, the Vermont; along with his companions Sewall K. Crocker, his pet pitbull Bud and frequent correspondence with Jackson's wife Bertha Richardson Wells (called "Swipes" by Jackson). The journey became a race among three teams, the winners being Jackson and Crocker.

The documentary has a companion book and audiobook, Horatio's Drive: America's First Road Trip, authored by Dayton Duncan and Ken Burns, published by Knopf in 2003.

Actors and historians
Several noted actors read the lines of various historical figures. They include:
Keith David - Narrator
Tom Hanks - Horatio Nelson Jackson

Archival footage of Horatio Nelson Jackson is included.

A series of American university professors of history provided background information.

Music 
The soundtrack includes a variety of music, including some bluegrass instrumentals and a modern rendition by Bobby Horton of an old song called "He'd Have to Get Under – Get Out and Get Under (to Fix Up His Automobile)".

External links
 
 PBS page on the documentary

Films set in the United States
Films shot in the United States
Documentary films about United States history
2003 television films
2003 films
American documentary television films
History of the automobile
Documentary films about automobiles
Films directed by Ken Burns
2000s American films